Events in the year 1898 in Portugal.

Incumbents
Monarch: Carlos I 
President of the Council of Ministers: José Luciano de Castro

Events
Establishment of SC Vianense.

Births
28 January - Vasco Santana, actor (died 1958)
28 February - Carlos Guimarães, footballer (deceased)
31 July - Alberto Augusto, footballer (died 1973)
14 May - Chianca de Garcia, film director (died 1983)
19 May - Gentil dos Santos, sprinter (deceased)
24 May - José Maria Ferreira de Castro, writer, journalist (died 1974)
3 September - Alves dos Reis, criminal (died 1955)
23 November - Jorge Gomes Vieira, footballer (died 1986)
Bernardo Marques, painter, illustrator, graphic artist, caricaturist (died 1962)

Deaths
28 January - Roberto Ivens, explorer of Africa, geographer, colonial administrator, Navy officer (born 1850)
10 July - José do Canto, landowner, intellectual (born 1820)
15 November - Henrique de Barros Gomes, politician (born 1843)

References

 
Portugal
Years of the 19th century in Portugal
Portugal